Attack on Galle Harbour 
was a suicide attack carried out by 15 Sea Tigers of the Liberation Tigers of Tamil Eelam (LTTE) on the commercial Galle Harbour and Sri Lanka Navy base SLNS Dakshina in the tourist town of Galle in southern Sri Lanka.

Attack
The Navy claimed that at 7.45 a.m. on the October 18, 2006,  five "sea tiger" suicide boats, disguised as fishing boats, the Navy destroyed three suicide boats and the other two approached the Galle harbour and detonated at the entrance. One sailor was killed and 11 were injured. One sailor is missing in action.

The pro-rebel TamilNet claimed that a 15-member team entered SLNS Dakshina in five vessels and attacked four Sri Lankan naval vessels and installations. At least three explosive-laden attack vessels attacked naval crafts, including a tsunami damaged sub chaser, SLNS Parakramabahu and destroyed a Fast Attack Craft and two water jet inshore patrol vessels anchored in the port base. However these have not been substantiated or excepted by the Sri Lankan defence ministry.

There are no Sea Tiger bases close by, it is believed attackers must have travelled a long distance to get to Galle. Some of the attackers died in the attack, while others escaped into the town - their fate is unknown while the navy carried out search operations.

The defence ministry said two people had been killed, one of them a sailor. At least 26 others, civilians among them, had been wounded, a statement said.

Aftermath
The Sri Lankan government responded with airstrikes in rebel territory. Commodore Manil Mendis, Commander of the Southern Naval Area was court-martialed and found guilty of two counts of not taking adequate precautions and counter-measures relating to the incident.

References

Liberation Tigers of Tamil Eelam attacks in Eelam War IV
Galle Harbour
2006 in Sri Lanka
Galle
October 2006 events in Asia
Terrorist incidents in Sri Lanka in 2006